Jack Sonni (born December 9, 1954) is a writer, musician and former marketing executive best known as "the other guitarist" in Dire Straits during the band's Brothers in Arms era.

Early life and education
Drawn to music at an early age, Sonni first learned piano, then trumpet, switching to guitar at 14. His love of the instrument led him to leave the University of Connecticut, where he was studying literature, to attend the Hartford Conservatory of Music.

Career
After graduating, Jack was introduced to New York session guitarist Elliott Randall (famous for his solo on the hit "Reelin' In the Years") by keyboardist Michael Holmes, a graduate of Eastman and bandmate of Tony Levin and Steve Gadd. Randall became a mentor and teacher and convinced Sonni to move to NYC and begin his career.  Jack lived in NYC from 1976 through 1985 initially trying to break into session work but began focusing on his own band. In the late 1970s, Sonni's band The Leisure Class had become a Monday night fixture at Kenny's Castaways on Bleecker Street in Greenwich Village, the place for up and coming acts.

In the fall of 1977, Jack went to work at Alex Music on 48th Street in Manhattan. In 1978 he started working at the newly opened Rudy's Music Stop, owned by luthier Rudy Pensa, where he met members of Dire Straits, first David and then Mark Knopfler.

He visited the Knopflers in London, and after David (and then Hal Lindes) left the band, Sonni was asked to join the band for the 1984 recording sessions for Brothers in Arms and the subsequent tour. Jack accepted, and played guitar synthesizer on "The Man's Too Strong." Jack also played the Live Aid concert at Wembley, on July 13, 1985, with Dire Straits.

After his collaboration with Dire Straits, Sonni contributed to other musicians' works but ended his professional musical career when his twin daughters were born in 1988. He began a second career as a marketing executive, first at Seymour Duncan, then Rivera Guitar Amplifiers followed by several years as director of marketing communications at Line 6, a manufacturer of digital technology products for musicians. He was instrumental in the development and launch of POD - which he named and gave the product its legendary shape. In 2001 he became vice president of marketing communication for Guitar Center, a position he left in 2006.

In the summer of 2006, Sonni left Guitar Center to write literature, and moved to San Jose del Cabo in 2007, then to Healdsburg, California, until January 2012, when he relocated to Brooklyn for a short time.

Sonni was writer-in-residence and House Manager at the Noepe Center for Literary Arts on Martha's Vineyard until its closing in 2017. He has also returned to playing music on a regular basis with his band, The Leisure Class. He appears regularly with other former members of Dire Straits in the DSL, Dire Straits Legacy project.

Discography
Brothers in Arms (1985)
Money for Nothing (compilation) (1988)
Sultans of Swing: The Very Best of Dire Straits (compilation) (1998)
The Best of Dire Straits & Mark Knopfler: Private Investigations (compilation) (2005)

References

American rock guitarists
American male guitarists
Dire Straits members
American people of Italian descent
Living people
1954 births
People from Indiana, Pennsylvania
20th-century American guitarists